Tó is a civil parish in the municipality of Mogadouro, Portugal,  with 23.66 km² of surface and 154 inhabitants in the year 2011.

Population

References

Freguesias of Mogadouro